The Bestiary, subtitled A Compendium of Creatures and Beings from the Lost World of Atlantis, is a supplement published by Bard Games in 1986 for The Atlantean Trilogy fantasy role-playing game, later known simply as Atlantis.

Contents
The Bestiary is a supplement which describes many fantastical creatures that can be used in the Atlantis role-playing game. The book is divided into two sections:
 Descriptions and illustrations of the creatures, which are grouped together as:
Sidhe
goblin races
sylvan races
giants
humanoids
wereos
hybrids and magical constructs
monstrosities
dragons
living dead
demons and devils
spirits and elementals
gods, as well as details of cults ands secret societies
 The technical details and statistics of each creature necessary for the role-playing game.

Publication history
In the 1980s a group of friends who played a customized version of Dungeons & Dragons — Vernie Taylor, Steven Cordovano, and Stephan Michael Sechi — decided to publish details of their home  campaign and each put up $600 to form Bard Games. In 1983 the new company published three books known as the "Compleat Series": The Compleat Adventurer by Sechi, The Compleat Spell Caster by Taylor and Sechi, and The Compleat Alchemist by Cordovano and Sechi. No specific role-playing system rules were credited, the assumption being that players would use the popular Dungeons & Dragons rules.  

The following year, these books were combined with a new role-playing system into one central rulebook, The Arcanum. This was followed by The Lexicon in 1985, which provided the setting, and The Bestiary in 1986, which provided the creatures. As a result, the role-playing game became known as The Atlantean Trilogy; later versions were titled simply Atlantis. 

The Bestiary, a 132-page softcover book, was written by Sechi and J. Andrew Keith, with illustrations by Bill Sienkiewicz, and cover art by P.D. Breeding.

In 1988, following the publication of a second edition of The Arcanum, Bard Press combined The Lexicon and The Bestiary into a single book, Atlantis: The Lost World.

Sechi would go on to produce the role-playing game Talislanta, also published by Bard Games in 1987.

In the 2014 book Designer & Dragons: The '80s, game historian Shannon Appelcline wrote that "Because of the success of their Compleat books, Bard Games decided to combine the best information from those supplements within a game system and a setting. The result — which would become known as "The Atlantis Trilogy" — would really put Bard on the map. Stephan Michael Sechi oversaw this new and daunting project — which took three years to complete. Eventually he produced three books: The Arcanum (1984), The Lexicon (1985), and The Bestiary (1986). The system was clearly derivative of D&D, but it also introduced character skills and point-based character creation. The setting was a bit more unique, as it portrayed an antediluvian world of myth (though it also contained some off-key elements including typical fantasy races of D&D and even druids). Some players embraced the new game as a more complex D&D with a uniquely textured setting." 

Appelcline also noted that Morrigan Press later "licensed the Talislanta setting from Stephan Michael Sechi and also bought the rights to two of his Atlantis rules books — The Lexicon and The Bestiary."

Reception
Phil Frances reviewed all three books of The Atlantean Trilogy for White Dwarf #85, and stated that "The Bestiary is my favourite because of the illustrations by Bill Sienkiewicz (of Marvel Comics) [...] A Monster Manual done with taste."

Other reviews
 Space Gamer/Fantasy Gamer, Issue 79 (Aug 1987, p. 41)

References

Fantasy role-playing game supplements
Role-playing game supplements introduced in 1986